The Hard Road: Restrung is a remix of Hilltop Hoods' previous album The Hard Road, featuring the Adelaide Symphony Orchestra and American freestyle rapper Okwerdz.

The album was released on 12 May 2007 in Australia, with a launch show and one-off performance with the Adelaide Symphony Orchestra at the Entertainment Centre on the release date. International guests Okwerdz and Mystro performed as a surprise for fans; they were not advertised on the bill. The performance was recorded, and will be feature on a DVD along with footage from recent Hilltop Hoods performances.

The album debuted at #8 on the ARIA Album Charts and was certified gold. The Hard Road: Restrung won the award for Best Urban Album at the 2007 ARIA Awards.

Album development
The Hard Road: Restrung was brought about in part by the Hilltop Hoods' performance with the string section of the Adelaide Symphony Orchestra during the 2006 ARIA Awards, where they performed "The Hard Road".

Two tracks were not included from the original album The Hard Road: "Blue Blooded" and "Circuit Breaker". This was down to the very nature of hip hop: "you are speeding things up or slowing them down when you sample them and that changes pitch. We had to pitch-shift entire songs so they were in tune with the orchestra and it just didn't work with those songs.".

The Hard Road: Restrung has a new order of tracks and also contains one new track "Roll on Up".

"Stopping All Stations" and "What a Great Night" also have new verses by Suffa on the former and Pressure on the latter.

The album was released in a censored format:
"we were working under the assumption that it was a requirement of working with the Adelaide Symphony Orchestra. Turns out that it wasn't (they've been really cool to work with, really flexible and laid back). By the time we found this out it was way too late in the mixing process to go back and change the edits."

Singles
"Recapturing The Vibe Restrung" was released as a single and a video was made and uploaded to YouTube on 13 December 2007.

Track listing

Charts

Weekly charts

Certifications

References

Hilltop Hoods albums
2007 remix albums
ARIA Award-winning albums
Obese Records albums